Verkhny Arshi (Dargwa: ЧебяхӀ ГӀярши) is a rural locality (a selo) and the administrative centre of Arshimakhinsky Selsoviet, Levashinsky District, Republic of Dagestan, Russia. The population was 994 as of 2010. There are 12 streets.

Geography 
Verkhny Arshi is located 24 km west of Levashi (the district's administrative centre) by road. Nizhniye Arshi and Kundurkhe are the nearest rural localities.

Nationalities 
Dargins live there.

References 

Rural localities in Levashinsky District